Events from the year 1798 in Canada.

Incumbents
Monarch: George III

Federal government
Parliament of Lower Canada: 2nd 
Parliament of Upper Canada: 2nd

Governors
Governor of the Canadas: Guy Carleton, 1st Baron Dorchester
Governor of New Brunswick: Thomas Carleton
Governor of Nova Scotia: John Wentworth
Commodore-Governor of Newfoundland: John Elliot
Governor of St. John's Island: Edmund Fanning
Governor of Upper Canada: John Graves Simcoe

Events
David Thompson travels to Mandan villages and charts headwaters of Mississippi River 
A new fur trading company is formed to compete with the North West Company. Confusingly called the New North West Company, it is nicknamed the XY Company from the way it differentiates its bales from those of its competitor. 
Indian chiefs, in Canada, claim from Vermont an equivalent of the greater part of Addison, Chittenden, Franklin and Grand Isle counties. They get their expenses to-and-fro.

Births
February 19 – Allan MacNab, businessman, soldier, lawyer and politician (died 1862)
April 3 – Louis Lacoste, politician (died 1878) 
April 20 – William Edmond Logan, geologist (died 1875)
April 26, – Charles-François Baillargeon, Archbishops of Quebec (died 1870)

Deaths
 May 10 – George Vancouver, naval officer, explorer (b.1757) 
 December 25 – Elias Hardy, lawyer and office-holder (b.1744)

Full date unknown
 Esteban José Martínez Fernández y Martínez de la Sierra, naval officer (b.1742)

References 

 
98